This is a list of German desserts. German cuisine has evolved as a national cuisine through centuries of social and political change with variations from region to region. The southern regions of Germany, including Bavaria and neighbouring Swabia, as well as the neighbouring regions in Austria across the border share many dishes.


German desserts

See also

 Cuisine
 German cuisine – Desserts
 List of desserts

References

German
Desserts